Ruth Scantlin, later Ruth Scantlin Roach, later Ruth Scantlin Roach Salmon (1896 – June 26, 1986), was a professional bronc rider, and world champion rodeo performer. Her 24-year career began in 1914 and ended in 1938, when she retired from the rodeo and started a ranching business in Nocona, Texas, with her husband, Fred Salmon. She is an inductee in the National Cowgirl Hall of Fame (1989) and the Rodeo Hall of Fame in the National Cowboy & Western Heritage Museum formerly known as the National Cowboy Hall of Fame (1989) and traveled the world with the Buffalo Bill Wild West Show and The 101 Real Wild West Show. Bronc riding was her favorite event, although she performed and won championship titles in other areas (as Ruth Roach). During her career she won the titles of World's Champion All Around Cowgirl,  World's Champion Trick Rider, and World's Champion Girl Bronc Rider.

She married fellow rider Brian Roach (winner of the 1919 Calgary Stampede bronc riding competition); after their divorce, she retained the name Roach for the rest of her career for professional reasons. She later married another rider, Ambrose Richardson, and Fred Alvord, a rodeo director and cowboy. Her final marriage was to Fred Salmon, a rancher.

References

External links
Ruth Scantlin Roach Salmon Collection, hosted by the Portal to Texas History

1896 births
1986 deaths
American female equestrians
Wild West show performers
Saddle bronc riders
Trick riding
Women stunt performers
Cowgirl Hall of Fame inductees
People from Nocona, Texas